Juan Mendoza Airport  is an extremely high elevation airport serving the city of Oruro, the capital of the Oruro Department in Bolivia.

The airport is in the eastern part of the city, which is in the altiplano of Bolivia. There is distant mountainous terrain east and west of the airport.

Airlines and destinations

See also
Transport in Bolivia
List of airports in Bolivia

References

External links
OpenStreetMap - Oruro
OurAirports - Oruro
Fallingrain - Juan Mendoza Airport

Oruro
Airports in Oruro Department